Qaemabad (also Romanized as Qā’emābād) is a village in Arzuiyeh Rural District, in the Central District of Arzuiyeh County, Kerman Province, Iran. At the 2006 census, its population was 41, in 7 families.

References 

Populated places in Arzuiyeh County